The 14801/14802 Jodhpur - Indore Express is an express train service which runs between Jodhpur Junction of Rajasthan and Indore Junction  of Madhya Pradesh. It is currently being operated with 14801/14802 train numbers on a daily basis.

Coach Composition

The train consists of 17 coaches :

 1 AC Chair Car
 3 AC III Tier
 2 Sleeper Coaches
 3 2nd Seating
 6 General Unreserved
 2 End On Generator

Service

The 14801/Jodhpur - Indore Express has an average speed of 47 km/hr and covers 740 km in 15 hrs 40 mins.

The 14802/Indore - Jodhpur Express has an average speed of 49 km/hr and covers 740 km in 15 hrs 05 mins.

Route and halts 

The important halts of the train are :

Schedule

Rake Sharing 

The train shares its rake with 12465/12466 Ranthambore Express.

Direction Reversal

Train reverses its direction 2 times at:

Traction

See also

 Ranthambore Express
 Indore–Jaipur Express
 Indore–Ajmer Express
 Veer Bhumi Chittaurgarh Express
 Bhopal–Jodhpur Express
 Dayodaya Express

References

Transport in Jodhpur
Transport in Indore
Express trains in India
Rail transport in Madhya Pradesh
Rail transport in Rajasthan
Railway services introduced in 2017